Slim till Dead (Orig. Sul sun) is a 2005 Hong Kong film directed by Marco Mak and stars Anthony Wong and Cherrie Ying.

Cast
 Anthony Wong
 Cherrie Ying
 Sheren Tang
 Raymond Wong Ho-yin
 Crystal Tin
 Zuki Lee 
 Wong Jing
 Jing Gangshan

External links

2005 films
2000s Cantonese-language films
2005 thriller films
Hong Kong thriller films
2000s Hong Kong films